Snooker world rankings 2005/2006: The professional world rankings for the top 64 snooker players in the 2005–06 season are listed below.

Note

 As the 2005 World Champion, Shaun Murphy automatically qualified for every ranking tournament and the Masters.
 Quinten Hann did not play due to an unspecified illness before being banned for 8 years for a match-fixing attempt.

References

2005
Rankings 2006
Rankings 2005